Springhouse Farm, also known as the Eric Knight Farm, is a historic home and farm located at Springfield Township, Bucks County, Pennsylvania. The house is a Georgian style stone farm house built about 1808, with an addition built about 1941.  Other contributing buildings and structures are a stone and frame bank barn (c. 1810) with carriage house addition (c. 1890), stone spring house (c. 1810), stone root cellar (c. 1810), corn crib (c. 1895), man made pond (c. 1940), outdoor oven (c. 1940), and privy (c. 1900).  The property also includes the burial site for Toots, the dog that inspired the story "Lassie Come-Home."  Toots died in 1945, and the burial site marker was added about 1970.  Its author Eric Knight (1897-1943) resided at Springhouse Farm from 1939 to 1943.

It was added to the National Register of Historic Places in 2007.

References

Lassie
Farms on the National Register of Historic Places in Pennsylvania
Georgian architecture in Pennsylvania
Houses in Bucks County, Pennsylvania
National Register of Historic Places in Bucks County, Pennsylvania